Laura Partenio (born ) is an Italian volleyball player, playing as an outside hitter. She was part of the Italy women's national volleyball team.

She participated at the 2011 Montreux Volley Masters, and 2013 FIVB Volleyball Women's U23 World Championship. She won the gold medal at the 2013 Mediterranean Games. On the club level she played for Tiboni Urbino in 2013.

References

External links
 http://www.scoresway.com/?sport=volleyball&page=player&id=7196
 http://www.volleywood.net/volleyball-features/the-other-side/laura-partenio/8
 http://www.legavolleyfemminile.it/?page_id=194&idat=PAR-LAU-91
 http://www.cev.lu/Competition-Area/PlayerDetails.aspx?TeamID=8394&PlayerID=14487&ID=678

1991 births
Living people
Italian women's volleyball players
Sportspeople from Venice
Competitors at the 2013 Mediterranean Games
Mediterranean Games gold medalists for Italy
Mediterranean Games medalists in volleyball
21st-century Italian women